Stefanos Chandakas (born 27 March 1972) is a Greek sailor, who represented his country at the 1996 Summer Olympics in Atlanta. He was born in Athens. Chandakas took the 18th place in Soling class with crew member Panagiotis Alevras and helmsman Stavros Alevras.

References 

1972 births
Living people
Sailors (sport) from Athens
Greek male sailors (sport)
Olympic sailors of Greece
Sailors at the 1996 Summer Olympics – Soling